Fritz Künkel (September 6, 1889 – April 1, 1956) was known both as a German psychiatrist and an American psychologist.  He might best be understood as a social scientist who sought to integrate psychology (especially the work of Freud, Adler and Jung), sociology and religion into a unified theory of human being.  He consolidated these insights into a theory of character development and finally into his "We-Psychology".

Biography 
The following material comes from the brief life written by  John A. Sanford with the assistance of Kunkel's two sons.

Kunkel was born the seventh of eight siblings, on a wealthy estate in Brandenburg (now Poland), on September 6, 1889.  His early life was characterized as carefree, imaginative, active and social.  While pursuing a variety of interests, he did manage to study medicine, receiving his medical degree “a few days after the beginning of the First World War” (1984, p. 1). At the Battle of Verdun, working as a battalion surgeon, he received a shrapnel wound that led to the loss of his left arm.

Around 1919-1920, Kunkel moved to Vienna, where he became associated with Alfred Adler. In 1924, he began to practice Adlerian psychotherapy in Berlin.  Over the next 10 to 15 years he built on his Adlerian foundations, publishing a dozen books and founding his unique school of "We-Psychology".

In 1920 he married Ruth Löwengard, who became his colleague and co-founder of the Adler Institute in Berlin. They had three children. After the death of Ruth in January 1932, he married Elizabeth Jensen, and they had two more children.

When Hitler came to power, Kunkel became increasingly disturbed by the restrictions being placed on psychotherapy, and he planned to immigrate to the USA with his family. He accepted an invitation by the Quakers to give a lecture tour in the United States in 1936, and again in 1939. When the war broke out in September 1939, he could not come back to Germany to pick up his family.

The eldest son came to the States in 1938, after having attended the Quaker school in Eerde, the Netherlands, and his two siblings, also Eerde students, followed after the war. Elizabeth and her two boys joined her husband in December 1947. Kunkel continued to develop the We-Psychology and his religious psychology, while leading an active life of writing, lecturing, and psychotherapy, until his death on Easter Sunday in 1956.

Literary works 
 Unknown year: Psychologie van het ongeloof (Dutch translation)
 1927 Die Grundbegriffe der Individualpsychologie (with Ruth Kunkel). Opvoeding tot persoonlijkheid (Dutch translation)
 1928 Die Arbeit am Character. God helps those. Karaktervorming door zelfopvoeding (Dutch translation)
 1929 Arbeit am Charakter
 1929-1935 Angewandte Charakterkunde, 6 vols
 1929 Part 1 from Angewandte Charakterkunde Einführung in die Characterkunde. Introduction a la characterologia. Inleiding tot de dialectische karakterkunde (Dutch translation). Let's be normal
 1929 Der kritische Punkt in der Charakterkunde.
 1929 Das Dumme Kind. Het domme kind (Dutch translation)
 1929 Vitale Dialektik. Levend denken (Dutch translation)
 1930 Jugendcharakterkunde. What It Means To Grow Up. Karakterkunde van de jeugd (Dutch translation)
 1931 Grundzüge der Politischen Charakterkunde. Individu en gemeenschap (Dutch translation)
 1931 Eine Angstneurose und Ihre Behandlung. Genezing van angst (Dutch translation)
 1931 Part 2 Charakter, Wachstum und Erziehung. Karakter, groei en opvoeding (Dutch translation). Character, Growth, and Education
 1932 Krisenbriefe. Crisisbrieven (Dutch translation)
 1932 Part 3 Charakter, Liebe und Ehe. Karakter, liefde en huwelijk (Dutch translation)
 1933 Part 4 Charakter, Einzelmensch und Gruppe. Groepskarakterkunde (Dutch translation)
 1934 Part 5 Charakter, Leiden und Heilung. Karakter, ziekte en genezing (Dutch translation)
 1935 Part 6 Charakter, Krisis und Weltanschauung, 2e bearbeitung von Vitale Dialektiek
 1935 Grundzüge der praktischen Seelenheilkunde. Conquer Yourself
 1936 Die Erziehung Deiner Kinder (with Elizabeth Kunkel)
 1939 Das Wir.
 1940 How Character Develops (with Roy Dickerson)
 1943 Ringen um Reife. In Search of Maturity
 1946 What Do You Advise? (with Ruth Gardner).
 1947 Creation Continues. Die Schöpfung geht weiter (German translation). De Schepping voltrekt zich (Dutch translation by Rob de Visser, published in December 2014)
 1947 My Dear Ego

References

External links
 https://web.archive.org/web/20050508015402/http://www.pedinova.ch/fritz-kuenkel-psycho.0.html (German)
 / Editor's note Kunkel Sel. Writings
 http://theologytoday.ptsem.edu/apr1985/v42-1-booknotes11.htm

German psychologists
20th-century American psychologists
1889 births
1956 deaths